Road signs in Switzerland and Liechtenstein generally conform to the 1968 Vienna Convention on Road Signs and Signals. 

Although Switzerland is not a member of the European Union, signs largely follow the general European conventions concerning the use of shape and color to indicate their function. This is just a general pattern, and there are several exceptions.

Concepts

Legal basis
The Swiss road signs are defined in the Road Signs Act, which is based on several laws and ordinances. Liechtenstein largely follows the legislation of Switzerland.

The major ones laws are:

Swiss laws

Laws of Liechtenstein

Language
Each canton is responsible for management and placement of its road signs and complementary panels and uses one of the four official languages of Switzerland accordingly.

Metrics
Distances and other measurements are displayed in metric units.

Categorization and design

Starting 2003, the font ASTRA-Frutiger is replacing the previous SNV, which is still used in several European countries.

Signs

Warning signs

Regulatory signs

Prohibitions

Mandatory Instructions

Priority signs

Indication signs

Conducting indication signs

Routing indication signs

... on main and minor roads

... numbering

... on motorways and expressways

... general

Informational signs

Complementary panels
General remarks:
All signs and complementary panels can be combined with complementary panels for particular kinds of transport means.
If accompanied with the words ausgenommen / Excepté / eccettuato (excluding) or gestattet / Autorisé / permesso (permitted), it means that the indicated kind of transport means are excluded from the regulation of the main sign.
The sign bicycles (5.31) also includes mopeds with a designed  maximal speed of 20km/h.

Road markings

Traffic lights

General Remarks:

Working traffic light signals (not turned off or not flashing yellow) precede the priority signs, the road markings, and the general road rules.
A yellow flashing traffic light warns of special caution, and the general road rules, priority signs, and road markings have to be applied and followed (in particular stop signs (see 3.01) or give way signs (see 3.02) and all other priority signs, or direction indications (e.g. see 2.32–2.43, 2.46, 6.06, 6.10, 6.13), and others)!
White traffic lights are addressed to public transport only.

General rules

Specifically addressed

Police instruction signs

Blue Zone parking disc
When parking in a Blue Zone you should set and display a blue parking disc with the time of arrival according to the Blue Zone Rules. Parking in a blue zone space is limited to 1 hour unless otherwise indicated. When parking, make sure the whole vehicle, including bumpers, are within the marked parking space.

Blue disks are available in various places, such as the police station, hotels, tourist offices, news stands, the local Gemeinde/Town hall, garages and gas stations. 

Blue Zone Parking Rules

From Monday to Saturday:

Between 8:00-11:30 and 13:30-18:00 set the disc to the exact time or the next half-hour mark if the exact time is not printed on the disc. Parking is allowed for 1 hour from set time.

Between 11:00-13:30 set the disc to the exact time or the next half-hour mark if the exact time is not printed on the disc. Parking is allowed until 14:30.

Between 18:00-19:00 set the disc to the exact time or the next half-hour mark if the exact time is not printed on the disc. Parking is allowed until 09:00 the next morning.

Between 19:00-07:59 blue disc is not needed if you leave by 08:00.

From Saturday 18:00 until Monday 09:00 blue-zone parking is free. No need to set blue disc.

For Blue Zones marked with a 4 digit area code and you do not have the corresponding parking permit just follow regular Blue Zone parking rules. If you have a valid parking permit for the specific area code, parking is unlimited in these zones.

See also
Road rules of Switzerland
Comparison of European road signs

References

External links
 Official Swiss Road Signs

Switzerland
Rules of the road
Traffic signals
Traffic law
Road transport in Switzerland